1 Chronicles 7 is the seventh chapter of the Books of Chronicles in the Hebrew Bible or the First Book of Chronicles in the Old Testament of the Christian Bible. The book is compiled from older sources by an unknown person or group, designated by modern scholars as "the Chronicler", and had the final shape established in late fifth or fourth century BCE. This chapter contains the genealogies of tribes settled north of Judah: Issachar, Benjamin, Naphtali, Manasseh, Ephraim and Asher. It belongs to the section focusing on the list of genealogies from Adam to the lists of the people returning from exile in Babylon (1 Chronicles 1:1 to 9:34).

Text
This chapter was originally written in the Hebrew language. It is divided into 40 verses.

Textual witnesses
Some early manuscripts containing the text of this chapter in Hebrew are of the Masoretic Text tradition, which includes the Aleppo Codex (10th century), and Codex Leningradensis (1008).

There is also a translation into Koine Greek known as the Septuagint, made in the last few centuries BCE. Extant ancient manuscripts of the Septuagint version include Codex Vaticanus (B; B; 4th century), and Codex Alexandrinus (A; A; 5th century).

Old Testament references
: ; 
: ; 
: ; 
: 
: 
: ; 
: ;

Structure
The whole chapter belongs to an arrangement comprising 1 Chronicles 2:3–8:40 with the king-producing tribes of Judah (David;
2:3–4:43) and Benjamin (Saul; 8:1–40) bracketing the series of lists as the priestly tribe of Levi (6:1–81) anchors the center, in the following order:
A David’s royal tribe of Judah (2:3–4:43)
B Northern tribes east of Jordan (5:1–26)
X The priestly tribe of Levi (6:1–81)
B' Northern tribes west of Jordan (7:1–40)
A' Saul’s royal tribe of Benjamin (8:1–40)

Descendants of Issachar (7:1–5)

Verse 1
Now the sons of Issachar were Tola, Puah, Jashub, and Shimron, four in all.
Cross references: ; 
"Jashub": from  yā-shūḇ (as the reading (qere); in writing:  yā-shîḇ) is written as "Job" in Genesis 46:13. Rashi notes that Job was the original name, but when the brothers settled themselves (נִתְיַשְּׁבוּ) to learn Torah (cf. 1 Chronicles 12: 33), “of the sons of Issachar, who possessed understanding of the times,” he merited, so was named Jashub.
"Puah": written as Puvvah in Genesis 46:13, and Puvah in Numbers 26:23.

Verse 5
And their brethren among all the families of Issachar were valiant men of might, reckoned in all by their genealogies fourscore and seven thousand.
"Reckoned": used only in Book of Ezra, Nehemiah and Chronicles, indicating the period when this list is compiled.

Descendants of Benjamin (7:6–12)
This is one of varying Benjamin's genealogies in Chronicles and other Old Testament documents, with one uniting element: Bela is Benjamin's firstborn son (cf. Genesis 46:21; Numbers 26:38; 1 Chronicles 8:1). A longer genealogy is listed in 1 Chronicles 8:1–28.

Verse 6
The sons of Benjamin; Bela, and Becher, and Jediael, three.

Verse 12
And Shuppim and Huppim were the sons of Ir, Hushim the son of Aher.
 "Ir": is written as "Iri" in verse 7.

Descendants of Naphtali (7:13)
The genealogy consists of only one verse, paralleling Genesis 46:24 and Numbers 26:48–50.

Descendants of Manasseh (7:14–19)
The list is difficult to understand because of possible transmission corruption in some places since it differs from older source (Numbers 26:29–34). It also parallels Joshua 17:1–6.

Verse 15
And Machir took to wife the sister of Huppim and Shuppim, whose sister's name was Maachah; and the name of the second was Zelophehad: and Zelophehad had daughters.
 "Zelophehad had daughters": Five daughters are named and play a significant role in Numbers 27:1–11 and 36:1–12 for the reinterpretation of laws of heredity which traditionally was only restricted to sons.

Descendants of Ephraim (7:20–29)
This section consists of 3 parts:
 genealogy of Ephraim
 a story
 genealogy of Joshua (continuation of verse 21a)

Verse 22
And Ephraim their father mourned many days, and his brothers came to comfort him.
This verse recalls the opening of the story of Job (Job 2:11) suggesting that the Chronicler wished to draw a parallel between Job and Ephraim,

Descendants of Asher (7:30–40)
The first part of Asher's genealogy parallels Genesis 46:17 and Numbers 26:44-7, but the rest  has no other parallel and contains far more non-Hebrew names than other biblical documents.

See also

Related Bible parts: Genesis 46, Numbers 26, Numbers 27, Numbers 36, Joshua 17, 1 Chronicles 8

Notes

References

Sources

External links
 Jewish translations:
 Divrei Hayamim I - I Chronicles - Chapter 7 (Judaica Press) translation [with Rashi's commentary] at Chabad.org
 Christian translations:
 Online Bible at GospelHall.org (ESV, KJV, Darby, American Standard Version, Bible in Basic English)
 First Book of Chronicles Chapter 7. Bible Gateway

07